Rocketship 7 was a children's television series that aired weekday mornings on WKBW-TV in Buffalo, New York from 1962 to 1978 and from 1992 to 1993.

The host of the show was Dave Thomas, who had joined WKBW in 1961. Promo the Robot was the show's other main on-air character. Rocketship 7 featured segments with Thomas and Promo along with cartoons and other short programs such as Davey and Goliath, and Gumby.  Thomas left the station in 1978 to join WPVI in Philadelphia, where he assumed the name "Dave Roberts" (He remained at WPVI until his retirement in 2009). When Roberts left, WKBW canceled Rocketship 7.

When The Commander Tom Show was cancelled in 1991, WKBW decided to continue the "Commander Tom" character of Tom Jolls by reviving Rocketship 7 as a weekly Saturday morning series. Airing at 7 AM, Captain Mike Randall assumed hosting duties for this version of the show with his sidekick, Yeoman Bob (Stilson), with Commander Tom Jolls, Promo the Robot, and Captain Comic (Tim Warchocki) making guest appearances.

Bob would always open the show with "Yo!" Cartoons aired included Super Chicken and George of the Jungle. Recurring feature on the 1992 series included "Crummy Cartoon Theater 2000," a parody of Mystery Science Theater 3000 where Randall and Stilson would riff on public domain cartoon shorts, and "Are You Kidding?", where children would tell riddles and jokes). To keep with the "Rocketship" theme, the station used the term "Planet Earth" as part of the station's mailing address for feedback and contests.

Rocketship 7 was cancelled for good in 1993, as infomercials, public affairs, and educational/informational programming began to dominate the Saturday morning lineup. It was effectively replaced in WKBW's lineup by the late-night hosted movie series Off Beat Cinema.

Former WKBW-TV Graphic Designer and 3D animator Tim Warchocki (who played Captain Comic) is responsible for Promo the Robot's updated fluorescent green and yellow paint job. Prior to the 1992 version of Rocketship 7 Tim was asked to update the robot's look to fit color television and modern design. The original body, designed when the show was still in black and white, was gray and (on color episodes) red.

Rocketship 7 is mentioned in "The X in the File", an episode of the Fox television series Bones.  In the episode, Agent Booth is excited to see a photo from the show, and claims he watched it regularly as a child.  Booth is played by David Boreanaz, son of Dave Thomas.

External links 
Rocketship 7 fan website

1960s American children's television series
1970s American children's television series
1990s American children's television series
Local children's television programming in the United States
1962 American television series debuts
1978 American television series endings
1992 American television series debuts
1993 American television series endings
American television shows featuring puppetry